Nadia Power (born 11 January 1998) is an Irish athlete. She competed in the women's 800 metres event at the 2021 European Athletics Indoor Championships. She was named as the Irish Times/Sport Ireland Sportswoman for January 2021.

References

External links
 
 
 
 

1998 births
Living people
Irish female middle-distance runners
Olympic athletes of Ireland
Athletes (track and field) at the 2020 Summer Olympics
Place of birth missing (living people)